Angel Del Villar II (born September 24, 1980), better known by his stage name Homeboy Sandman, is an American rapper from Elmhurst, Queens, New York, United States.

Career
Homeboy Sandman recorded and released his first EP, Nourishment, in March 2007.  His debut album, entitled Nourishment (Second Helpings), was released in August 2007. In early 2008, Homeboy Sandman's work began to be featured on underground radio programs the Squeeze Radio Show on WKCR 89.9 FM and the Halftime Radio Program on WNYU 89.1 FM in New York.  In June 2008, he was featured in Source Magazine's "Unsigned Hype" column.

His second album, Actual Factual Pterodactyl was acclaimed upon its release in August 2008.  The album received an entry in XXLs Chairman's Choice column, which praised Homeboy Sandman's "sharp lyrics and irresistibly melodic flow, which, together, form an elastic instrument few MCs can match."  Actual Factual Pterodactyl received critical acclaim in a multitude of other print and online publications, including Blender Magazine, Beyond Race Magazine, Okayplayer.com and MSN.com.  At the end of 2008, Homeboy Sandman was named "Best Hip Hop Act in NYC 2008" by New York Press.  Recently his music has received rotation on NYC's Power 105.1 FM and Hot 97.1 FM, the city's #1 Hip Hop and R&B radio station, as well as airplay on Spitkicker Radio (Channel 65 on XM Satellite Radio), DJ Premier's "Live From HeadQCourterz" (Sirius Satellite Radio's #1 ranked Hip Hop show) and BBC 1Xtra's Hip Hop M1X (Hosted by DJ Sarah Love).

In addition to his studio releases, Homeboy Sandman has garnered attention for his live performances.  From January 2008 to August 2009, Homeboy Sandman served as the host of “ALL THAT! Hip Hop, Poetry and Jazz” at the Nuyorican Poets Café, New York City’s longest running open mic session (originally hosted by Hip Hop icon Bobbito García).  He has performed at the biggest hip hop shows around the country, including the South by Southwest (SXSW) music festival in Austin, Texas, the Brooklyn Hip Hop Festival in Brooklyn, New York, the Rock the Bells hip hop festival in Long Island, New York, the A3C Hip Hop Festival in Atlanta, Georgia and New York City's CMJ Music Marathon.  Homeboy Sandman has recorded video interviews with other performers at his live shows, which are captured in his YouTube video series "Homeboy Sandman presents Live From..."

In addition to his own releases, Homeboy Sandman has appeared on records by other artists, frequently with members of the AOK Collective, with whom he is affiliated.  He recently appeared on Fresh Daily's 2009 album The Gorgeous Killer: In Crimes of Passion and the 2008 album For Your Consideration released by P.SO (formerly P. Casso).  Homeboy Sandman collaborated with both Fresh Daily and P.SO for the song "Get On Down," which is featured on Sonic Smash, the album released in 2009 by music producer DJ Spinna. Homeboy Sandman has also laid down tracks for a series of features with RIDES Magazine. The track that Homeboy Sandman created for the Loud.com challenge, "Gun Control," was cited as one of the Top 25 Songs of 2009 by Hot 97 DJ Peter Rosenberg.

On June 1, 2010, Homeboy Sandman released his third album, The Good Sun, which features production from 2 Hungry Bros, Ski Beats, Thievin' Stephen, DJ Spinna, Psycho Les (The Beatnuts) and Core Rhythm, among others.  The first single from The Good Sun was "Angels with Dirty Faces," produced by J57.   In September 2010, Homeboy Sandman released his first official video for The Good Sun for the track, "The Essence".

In late 2010, Homeboy Sandman was featured as the coach in an episode of MTV's Made, which premiered in October 2010.

In August 2011, Homeboy Sandman signed with Stones Throw Records and released his debut project, Subject: Matter EP, with the California-based record label on January 24, 2012. Homeboy Sandman released his second EP with Stones Throw Records, titled Chimera in April 2012 and on September 18, 2012 released his debut full-length LP with Stones Throw entitled First of a Living Breed. The album featured production from Oddisee, J57, 6th Sense, RTNC and long-time production partners 2 Hungry Bros., along with label mates Jonwayne and Oh No, amongst others.

In 2014, Homeboy Sandman released the EP, White Sands, which was produced by Paul White. Nate Patrin of Pitchfork commented that the producer and rapper had "a mutually beneficial set of styles" in a positive review. In that year, Homeboy Sandman released the album, Hallways.

In the wake of the Donald Sterling scandal, Homeboy Sandman wrote for Gawker an op-ed called "Black People are Cowards," which attracted more than 1.3 million views in the first seven days of its publication.

In 2015, Homeboy Sandman released a collaborative EP with Aesop Rock, titled Lice. In 2016, he released the album, Kindness for Weakness, which included Edan-produced "Talking (Bleep)". In that year, he released a collaborative EP with Aesop Rock, titled Lice Two: Still Buggin'''.

In 2019, Homeboy Sandman announced he had signed a new deal with Mello Music Group and released the new single "West Coast" produced by Aesop Rock to celebrate the new label signing.

Homeboy Sandman’s first album on Mello Music Group, “Dusty,” was released on October 18, 2019. Production was handled entirely by Mono En Stereo. Dusty garnered positive reviews from music critics. AllMusic writer Paul Simpson praised Mono En Stereo's soundscape of "laid-back, ambling jazz and funk grooves" for complimenting Sandman's "conversational, matter-of-fact rhymes" throughout the album, concluding that "Dusty is another winning set of pointed observations from Sandman, who effortlessly unloads his thoughts without seeming like a burden on the listener."

Homeboy Sandman followed up “Dusty” with his 2020 album “Don’t Feed The Monster” produced by Quelle Chris. “Don’t Feed The Monster” was listed in NPR’s top 50 albums of 2020. Homeboy Sandman would later receive a pair of awards for music videos that accompanied the album. He received a UK Music Video award for “Monument” (directed by Pavel Buryak) in 2021 and later won Best Foreign Documentary at Rome Film Awards 2022 for Don’t Look Down Video (directed by Robert Mayer aka Photo Rob).

At the beginning of 2021, Aesop Rock and Homeboy Sandman released their single “Ask Anyone,” which was featured on FIFA 21 soundtrack. Following the release Homeboy Sandman announced his EP Anjelitu which was produced entirely by Aesop Rock. Released in August 2021, Anjelitu marked Homeboy Sandman’s third studio project on Mello Music Group. Okayplayer highlighted Anjelitu as one of the best Hip-Hop projects of 2021. Pete Rock would later give praise to “Go Hard” from Anjelitu. At the end of 2021, Homeboy Sandman garnered unexpected attention after Doja Cat saluted the emcee as “One of my favorite rappers” on Instagram live.

Homeboy Sandman's tenth studio album, There in Spirit, was released on February 25, 2022. That same year, he released the mixtape I Can't Sell These for free on Bandcamp, due in part to an inability to clear the various samples used in the music. Music critic Robert Christgau soon hailed it as "the finest album of one of hip-hop's most prolific careers", giving it an "A" grade.

Homeboy Sandman revitalized his acclaimed Anjelitu EP, by releasing the Anjelitu Deluxe which included two new tracks as well as Aesop Rock’s instrumentals from the project. In 2022, Rhymesayers released all three of Homeboy Sandman and Aesop Rock’s Lice albums on digital streaming platforms. Homeboy Sandman’s Deca-produced eleventh studio album “Still Champion” was released on November 11, 2022 following the pair’s 19-stop co-headlining tour. “Still Champion” reached #24 on the iTunes Hip-Hop charts and Riff Magazine included the project in their top 20 Hip-Hop albums of 2022.

Personal life
Del Villar's father and mother were born in the Dominican Republic and Puerto Rico respectively. His father boxed as a heavyweight before becoming an attorney.

He graduated from the University of Pennsylvania with a Bachelor of Arts degree and went on to accept a scholarship to attend law school before dropping out to focus on music.

Discography
Albums
 Nourishment (Second Helpings) (2007)
 Actual Factual Pterodactyl (2008)
 The Good Sun (2010)
 First of a Living Breed (2012)
 Hallways (2014)
 Kindness for Weakness (2016)
 Veins (2017)
 Dusty (2019) (w/ Mono en Stereo)
 Don't Feed the Monster (2020) (w/ Quelle Chris)
 Anjelitu Deluxe (2022) (w/ Aesop Rock)
 Still Champion (2022)

EPs
 Nourishment (2007)
 Subject: Matter (2012)
 Chimera EP (2012)
 Kool Herc: Fertile Crescent (2013) (w/ El RTNC)
 All That I Hold Dear (2013) (w/ M Slago)
 White Sands (2014) (w/ Paul White)
 Homeboy Sandman Is the Sandman (2014) (w/ Blu)
 Lice (2015) (w/ Aesop Rock)
 Lice Two: Still Buggin' (2016) (w/ Aesop Rock)
 Lice Three: Triple Fat Lice (2017) (w/ Aesop Rock)
 Humble Pi (2018) (w/ Edan)
 Anjelitu (2021) (w/ Aesop Rock)
 There in Spirit (2022)

Mixtapes
 There Is No Spoon (2008) (w/ DJ BabeyDrew)
 Orphans (2013) (w/ DJ Jav)
 Tour Tape (2015)
 LoveLife (2017)
 I Can't Sell These (2022)

Singles
 "King of Kings" (2010)

Guest appearances
 2 Hungry Bros. - "Parallel Perpendicular" from My Crew's All Thinner (2009)
 P. Casso - "Best in Show" from For Your Consideration (2009)
 Fresh Daily - "Starter Pistol" from The Gorgeous Killer: In Crimes of Passion (2009)
 DJ Spinna - "Thirst" (2009)
 Mr. Beatz - "The Cipher" from Spit Therapy (2010)
 Ciph Diggy - "Synchronized Rhymin" from Untitled Wave (2010)
 Jonny October - "Brooklyn Bards" from The Wheelhouse (2010)
 J-Live - "Fitness" from Undivided Attention (2010)
 DJ Spinna - "Get On Down" from Sonic Smash (2010)
 Mick Boogie x Terry Urban - "Intro" from Le Da Soul: 20 Years of De La Soul (2010)
 J.J. Brown - "Up to No Good (Remix)" from Connect the Dots (2010)
 Paul White - "A Weird Day" from Rapping with Paul White (2011)
 Mr. SOS – "O!" from Cassette Verité (2011)
 Illus - "Free" from For Adam (2011)
 Blu & Exile - "The Great Escape" from Give Me My Flowers While I Can Still Smell Them (2012)
 Gensu Dean - "Ramesses" (2012)
 Evitan - "Let the Horns Blow" from Speed of Life (2012)
 Jaq - "Hear This" from Escape from Radio Prison (2012)
 Rabbi Darkside - "Clotheslines" from Prospect Avenue (2013)
 Paper Tiger - "The Sting" from Laptop Suntan (2013)
 Paul White - "Find a Way" from Watch the Ants (2013)
 Blu and Nottz - "Crooks in Castles" from Gods in the Spirit (2013)
 J-Live - "Hang On Tight" from Around the Sun (2014)
 L'Orange - "Mind vs. Matter" from The Orchid Days (2014)
 L'Orange and Jeremiah Jae - "Ignore the Man to Your Right" from The Night Took Us In Like Family (2015)
 Until the Ribbon Breaks - "Perspective" from A Lesson Unlearnt (2015)
 Deacon the Villain - "Little Drummer Boy" from Peace or Power (2015)
 Finale - "Just Due" from Odds & Ends (2015)
 The Difference Machine - "Smoke" from The 4th Side of the Eternal Triangle (2016)
 Dillon & Paten Locke - "Hamsammich" from Food Chain (2016)
 Sammus - "Weirdo" from Pieces in Space (2016)
 Gensu Dean - "Where Is the Love" from RAW (Refined Alkaline Water) (2016)
 Onry Ozzborn - "Wine" from Duo (2016)
 Quelle Chris - "Pendulum Swing" from Being You Is Great, I Wish I Could Be You More Often (2017)
 Billy Woods - "Wonderful" from  Known Unknowns  (2017)
 Rob Sonic - "HORSE" from  Latrinalia  (2021)
 Aesop Rock & Blockhead - "All Day Breakfast" from  Garbology '' (2021)

References

External links
 
 

1980 births
American rappers of Dominican Republic descent
Living people
Rappers from New York City
Musicians from Queens, New York
Holderness School alumni
21st-century American rappers
21st-century American male musicians
American male rappers
Puerto Rican rappers
University of Pennsylvania School of Arts and Sciences alumni